Yerba Buena High School is a public, comprehensive four-year high school located in the East San Jose area of San Jose, California, USA. Its athletic teams are well-known, and the school has the Engineering MAGNET program and the Green Construction/Architecture MAGNET program. The principal of Yerba Buena High School is Mary Pollett.

Demographics 
The student body is roughly 10% from other South and Central America countries such as (Ecuador, El Salvador, Honduras), 55% Mexican and 40% Vietnamese American, with a small student body of Filipino Americans, Cambodian Americans, Africans Americans, and Caucasian.

As of the 2012–2013 school year, Yerba Buena High School had a 72.68% graduation rate amongst its senior class. This number is up from the 2011-2012 graduation rate of 67.38%. Of these students, 31.56% who graduated met the requirements to admission to the University of California and/or California State University campuses.

Curriculum
Advanced Placement (AP) courses are offered at Yerba Buena. As of 2013, 34% of students participated in at least one AP course and/or exam. The average number of tests per students taking the AP exams was 3.1.

The school has the Engineering MAGNET program affiliated with Project Lead the Way for students to begin in grade 9 until graduation. The program focuses on a strong academic core curriculum that integrates the theoretical principles of math and science with practical application of technology. The program also provides college preparatory work in the humanities, foreign languages, and social sciences as well as summer enrichment classes.

There is also the Green Construction/Architecture MAGNET program for students at Yerba Buena. In the program students learn important aspects of building development and design, and use mathematics, sciences, and standard engineering practices to design residential and commercial projects. Participating students document their work through a 3D architecture design software.

Notable alumni
Ken Taylor, football player
Jethro Franklin, defensive line coach for the Oakland Raiders
Lloyd Pierce, Head coach for the Atlanta Hawks

See also
Santa Clara County high schools

References

External links
Official website

East Side Union High School District
High schools in San Jose, California
Educational institutions established in 1971
Public high schools in California
1971 establishments in California